Dragonfire is a 1982 video game written by Bob Smith and published by Imagic. The player grabs treasure guarded by a dragon while avoiding fireballs. It was originally released for the Atari 2600 then ported to the Intellivision, VIC-20, Commodore 64, Apple II, ZX Spectrum, ColecoVision, and TRS-80 Color Computer.

The game's source code was put into the public domain by developer Bob Smith on May 24, 2003.

Gameplay

Each level of Dragonfire has two stages. The first stage is a side view of the character trying to cross a drawbridge to reach a castle. To traverse the bridge, the player must duck under high fireballs and jump over low fireballs. Upon success, the second stage begins, which has a more top-down point of view. The player guides the character around the room collecting treasure and dodging fireballs spewed by a dragon that patrols the bottom of the screen. Collecting every piece of treasure opens a door to the next level.

A single hit from a fireball in either stage takes one of the player's seven initial lives. In each level, the character and fireballs get progressively faster.

Reception
Electronic Games in 1983 described Dragonfire as "especially useful as an introduction to fantasy gaming for younger players — while still having enough thrills to please the rest". The game would go on to receive a Certificate of Merit in the category of "1984 Best Videogame Audio-Visual Effects (Less than 16K ROM)" at the 5th annual Arkie Awards.

Legacy
A remake was announced in 2018 for the Intellivision Amico.

References

External links
Dragonfire for the Atari 2600 at Atari Mania

1983 Dragonfire TV commercial

1982 video games
Action video games
Atari 2600 games
ColecoVision games
VIC-20 games
Video games about dragons
Intellivision games
Multiplayer and single-player video games
TRS-80 Color Computer games
Imagic games
Public-domain software with source code
Video games developed in the United States
Video games set in castles